Axel Olaf Lindstrom (August 26, 1895 - June 24, 1940)  was a pitcher for the 1916 Philadelphia Athletics.

The 1916 A's had the worst winning percentage of any major league baseball team in the 20th century. Lindstrom made his lone appearance at the close of the season, pitching the last four innings on October 3.  He allowed just two earned runs to get the save.  This meant that Lindstrom actually ended the season tied for the team lead in saves, with one.  (Two other pitchers also saved one game apiece for the 1916 A's.)

In his only two big league at-bats, he went one-for-two, and singled home a run.

Lindstrom was born in Sweden in 1895 and died in North Carolina in 1940.

Sources
1916 American League Team Statistics and Standings
Baseball Reference major league statistics
Baseball Reference minor league statistics

Major League Baseball pitchers
Philadelphia Athletics players
Mobile Bears players
Nashville Vols players
New Haven Profs players
Toledo Mud Hens players
Wilkes-Barre Barons (baseball) players
Worcester Boosters players
Worcester Busters players
Major League Baseball players from Sweden
1895 births
1940 deaths
Swedish emigrants to the United States
Fitchburg (minor league baseball) players